Zachow may refer to:

Places
Czachów, West Pomeranian Voivodeship, (German: Zachow) is a village in north-western Poland
Zachow, Wisconsin, is an unincorporated community located in Shawano County, Wisconsin, United States

People
Friedrich Wilhelm Zachow (1663–1712), German musician and composer